Hierro is a 2009 psychological thriller directed by Gabe Ibáñez and starring Elena Anaya, Kaiet Rodríguez, Bea Segura, and Andrés Herrera.

Plot 
Six months after her young son Diego mysteriously disappears while travelling by ferry to the island of El Hierro, Maria is finally overcoming the pain of her loss. However, a phone call notifying her of the discovery of a child's body on the island forces her to go back to the island. Her return to the sinister island full of malevolent characters marks the beginning of a nightmarish journey where she learns that "some mysteries should never be revealed".

Cast
 Elena Anaya as María
 Hugo Arbues as Mateo
 Jon Ariño as Forense
 Miriam Correa as Julia
 Tomás del Estal
 Andrés Herrera as Antonio
 Javier Mejía as Matias
 Kaiet Rodriguez as Diego
 Raquel Salvador as Elena
 Bea Segura as Laura
 Mar Sodupe as Tania

Production
The film is from the producers of Pan's Labyrinth and The Orphanage, it was directed by short film director Gabe Ibáñez, who shot his film of the Canary Islands in El Hierro, Gran Canaria and Madrid.

Release
The Director Ibáñez's first feature premiered on 2 October 2009 at Sitges 42nd Fantastic Film International Festival and had an appearance at the 2009 Cannes Film Festival in the critic's week category, it runs of several film Festivals includes UK FrightFest 2009.

References

External links 
 

2009 films
2009 fantasy films
2009 psychological thriller films
2000s Spanish-language films
Films set on islands
Films shot in the Canary Islands
Films set in Madrid
Films shot in Madrid
Films scored by Zacarías M. de la Riva
Telecinco Cinema films
Spanish psychological thriller films